Julio César Sabala De Jesús, (born in Santo Domingo, Dominican Republic) better known as Julio Sabala is a Dominican impersonator, comedian, singer, and actor who has been on the air for more than 30 years doing comedy and diverse entertainment forms.

Early life
Sabala used to work in a circus named El Circo De Los Muchachos (The Boys' Circus). He also worked in the films Contigo (1988), Encantada de la vida (1993) and Ven al Paralelo (1992).

References

External links
 

Living people
Dominican Republic comedians
Dominican Republic male actors
20th-century Dominican Republic male singers
Year of birth missing (living people)